Edward "Ed" Broxterman (born November 28, 1973, in Baileyville, Kansas) is an American retired high jumper.

He competed at the 1996 Olympic Games without reaching the final.

His personal best jump is 2.30 metres, achieved in June 1996 in Atlanta.

He is currently working for Westar Energy in Leavenworth Kansas.

See also
 World Fit

References

 

1973 births
Living people
American male high jumpers
Athletes (track and field) at the 1996 Summer Olympics
Olympic track and field athletes of the United States
People from Nemaha County, Kansas